Those Happy Years is a 2013 Italian drama film directed by Daniele Luchetti. It was screened in the Special Presentation section at the 2013 Toronto International Film Festival.

Cast
 Kim Rossi Stuart as Guido
 Micaela Ramazzotti as Serena
 Martina Gedeck as Helke
 Samuel Garofalo as Dario
 Niccolò Calvagna as Paolo
 Benedetta Buccellato as Nonna Marcella
 Pia Engleberth as Nonna Marina
 Angelique Cavallari as Michelle

References

External links
 

2013 films
2013 drama films
Italian drama films
2010s Italian-language films
Films directed by Daniele Luchetti
Films set in 1974
Films about dysfunctional families
2010s Italian films